Ferenc Steiner (born 16 September 1888, date of death unknown) was a Hungarian cyclist. He competed in the individual time trial event at the 1924 Summer Olympics.

References

External links
 

1888 births
Year of death missing
Hungarian male cyclists
Olympic cyclists of Hungary
Cyclists at the 1924 Summer Olympics
Cyclists from Budapest